Éric Renaud (born 30 May 1961) is a French sprint canoeist who competed in the 1980s. At the 1984 Summer Olympics in Los Angeles, he won a bronze medal in the C-2 1000 m event.

References

Sports-reference.com profile

1961 births
Canoeists at the 1984 Summer Olympics
French male canoeists
Living people
Olympic canoeists of France
Olympic bronze medalists for France
Olympic medalists in canoeing
Medalists at the 1984 Summer Olympics